Carabus nitens is a species of ground beetle native to the Palearctic. In Europe, it is observed in Austria, the Baltic states, Benelux, the Czech Republic, France, Germany, Great Britain including the Isle of Man, Republic of Ireland, Kaliningrad, Northern Ireland, Poland, Romania, Scandinavia, Slovakia, and Eastern Europe.

References

External links
Global Biodiversity Information Facility

nitens
Beetles of Europe
Beetles described in 1758
Taxa named by Carl Linnaeus